Cristian Fernández Conchuela (born 22 December 1988) is a Spanish footballer who plays for CD Calahorra as a left winger.

Football career
Born in Guadalajara, Castile-La Mancha, Fernández made his senior debuts in amateur football. In 2009, he joined Albacete Balompié, going on to play nearly two full seasons with the B-team in the fourth division and scoring 17 goals in his second as the side finished in second position.

On 2 April 2011, Fernández made his official debut with Albacete's main squad, playing 25 minutes in a second level match against UD Salamanca after coming on as a substitute for David Sousa, in an eventual 1–0 home win. He appeared in a further eight league games during the campaign, which ended in relegation.

Fernández stayed in division two for 2011–12, signing with CD Guadalajara which he had already represented as a youth. After another relegation in 2013 he joined SD Ponferradina, newly promoted to the second tier.

References

External links

1988 births
Living people
People from Guadalajara, Spain
Sportspeople from the Province of Guadalajara
Spanish footballers
Footballers from Castilla–La Mancha
Association football forwards
Segunda División players
Segunda División B players
Tercera División players
Atlético Albacete players
Albacete Balompié players
CD Guadalajara (Spain) footballers
SD Ponferradina players
Recreativo de Huelva players
Lleida Esportiu footballers
CF Talavera de la Reina players
CD Calahorra players